The Museum of Medieval Stockholm, centrally located north of the Royal Palace, was constructed around old monuments excavated in an extensive archaeological dig (dubbed Riksgropen, "National/State Pit") in the late 1970s. Part of Stockholm's city wall, dating from the early 16th century, was also found. In order to make the finds accessible to the general public, a planned subterranean garage had to give way to the Museum of Medieval Stockholm, which was inaugurated in 1986. Museum director Margareta Hallerdt created a visionary state-of-the-art museum, designed by artist Kerstin Rydh, that received both national and international acclaim and won the European Museum of the Year Award in 1986.

The museum was closed from June 15, 2007, until early 2010 during the restoration of the bridge Norrbro. During this period, the exhibition was rebuilt while a minor temporary exhibition was available in Kulturhuset at Sergels torg.

The museum enables visitors to experience medieval Stockholm, with its brick houses and booths, workshops, harbour and gallows. It relates the medieval history of the city from the 1250s to the 1520s. In 2010, to celebrate 800 years since the birth of Birger Jarl, the founder of Stockholm, the museum opened an exhibition with a reconstruction of his face.

The Museum of Medieval Stockholm produces theme exhibitions with a medieval emphasis and arranges lectures, symposia and programmes. It engages in broad educational activities, in which children, youth and schools are a key target group. The museum has a shop that sells books relating to the Middle Ages, and also postcards and jewelry.

See also 
 List of museums in Stockholm
 Stockholm City Museum
 Stockholm County Museum

References

External links 

The Museum of Medieval Stockholm

Museums in Stockholm
City museums in Sweden
History museums in Sweden
Medieval Sweden